Getta unicolor is a moth of the  family Notodontidae. It is found in South America, including Peru, Ecuador, Colombia, Venezuela and Guyana.

External links
Species page at Tree of Life project

Notodontidae of South America
Moths described in 1925